Baccaurea courtallensis is a flowering plant evergreen tree species belonging to the family Phyllanthaceae. It is endemic to the Western Ghats mountains in India. It is a medium size understory tree frequent in tropical wet evergreen forests of the low and mid-elevations (40-1000m). It is a Near Threatened species according to the IUCN Red List of Threatened Species.

Description 
It is a medium size tree up to 10-18m tall and girth up to 1.3 m. Bark is grey and generally smooth or scaly. The leaves are simple, alternate and clustered at twig end. The leaf petiole is 1.2 to 3.8 cm long and swollen at both ends.

The flowers are scarlet in colour and dioecious. Inflorescence are in long stalks arranged in clusters growing on the trunk of the tree i.e. cauliflorous. Male inflorescence is clustered all over the trunk. Female inflorescence is clustered mostly at the base of the trunk. The fruit are globose, crimson coloured and ribbed.

Common names 
Malayalam: Mootilpazham, Mootilthoori, Mootippuli, Mootikaya

Kannada: Kolikukke, Kodikukke, Kolakukki

Tamil: Kuran Pazam

Distribution and habitat 
This tree is endemic to the Western Ghats.

Ecology 
Flowering: Aug, Nov, Dec. Leaf buds and fruits are eaten by Nilgiri Langurs, Elephants and Lion-tailed Macaques were also known to feed on the ripe fruits.

Uses 
The fruit is edible and eaten by people

Gallery

References 

Flora of India (region)
Endemic flora of India (region)
Flora of Tamil Nadu
Flora of Kerala
Flora of Karnataka
courtallensis